The 1999 Estoril Open women's doubles was the doubles event of the first edition of the WTA Tour Estoril Open; a WTA Tier IV tournament and the most prestigious women's tennis tournament held in Portugal. This tournament was part of the ITF Tour last year, and it was won by Caroline Dhenin and Émilie Loit. They did not compete in the event this year.

Alicia Ortuño and Cristina Torrens Valero won in the final 7–6(7–4), 3–6, 6–3 against Anna Földényi and Rita Kuti-Kis.

Seeds

Draw

Qualifying

Seeds

Qualifiers
  Nirupama Vaidyanathan /  Andreea Vanc

Qualifying draw

External links
 1999 Estoril Open Women's Doubles Draw

1999 Women's Doubles
Estoril Open
Estoril Open